Insaaf is a 1987 Bollywood action film directed by Mukul Anand, starring Vinod Khanna, Dimple Kapadia and Suresh Oberoi. The film was remade in Tamil as Chinnappadass with Sathyaraj.

Cast

Soundtrack
Farooq Kaiser wrote the songs.

References

External links
 

1987 films
1980s Hindi-language films
Films directed by Mukul S. Anand
Films scored by Laxmikant–Pyarelal
Hindi films remade in other languages